DETO is a Dutch amateur association football club from Vriezenveen, Overijssel. They are currently playing in the Vierde Divisie, the third tier of amateur football in the Netherlands and the fifth tier overall. Traditional colours are red and black.

References 

 
Football clubs in the Netherlands
Association football clubs established in 1948
1948 establishments in the Netherlands
Football clubs in Overijssel
Sport in Twenterand